Lulu by Night is a 1986 Spanish comedy-drama thriller film directed, written and produced by Emilio Martínez-Lázaro and starring Imanol Arias, Asunción Balaguer and Antonio Resines. It is composed by Ángel Muñoz-Alonso. It is based on the stage play Lulu, by Franz Wedekind.

Cast

References

External links
 

1986 comedy-drama films
1980s comedy thriller films
Spanish comedy-drama films
Films directed by Emilio Martínez Lázaro
Films produced by Fernando Trueba
Films scored by Maestro Reverendo
Televisión Española films
Films about Jack the Ripper
Films about theatre
Spanish films based on plays
Films about prostitution in Spain
1986 films